Konstantin Romanovich Milyukov (born 27 March 1994) is a retired Russian-born figure skater who competed for Belarus. He is the 2020 Ice Star silver medalist, the 2020 Winter Star silver medalist, and the 2021 Belarusian national champion. He competed in the final segment at the 2021 World Championships held in Stockholm, Sweden.

Milyukov has represented Belarus since 2019. Earlier in his career representing Russia, he was the 2017 Santa Claus Cup champion.

Programs

Competitive highlights 
CS: Challenger Series

For Belarus

For Russia

References

External links 
 
 
  

1994 births
Living people
Belarusian male single skaters
Russian male single skaters
Sportspeople from Kazan
Russian emigrants to Belarus
Figure skaters at the 2022 Winter Olympics
Olympic figure skaters of Belarus